Sucker for Love is a song written by Pauline Kamusewu, Fredrik "Fredro" Ödesjö, Andreas Levander and Johan "Jones" Wetterberg., and originally performed by Pauline Kamusewu at Melodifestivalen 2010 during the second semifinal in Sandviken where it made it further to Andra chansen before getting knocked out.

The song charted at Svensktoppen for one week. before leaving chart.

During Melodifestivalen 2012 the song appeared at "Tredje chansen".

Charts

References 

2010 singles
English-language Swedish songs
Melodifestivalen songs of 2010
Pauline Kamusewu songs
2010 songs